Shirley L. Crites (August 21, 1934 – December 28, 1990) was an infielder who played in the All-American Girls Professional Baseball League during the  season. Crites batted and threw right-handed. She was born in Cape Girardeau, Missouri.

"Squirrely", as her teammates nicknamed her, played briefly for the 1953 pennant-winning Fort Wayne Daisies. She hit a .129 average in 47 games, appearing mainly at third base as a backup to incumbent Catherine Horstman, which gave manager Bill Allington the chance to use Horstman more as a pitcher.

Fort Wayne clinched the title with a 66–39 record, 4½ games ahead of the Grand Rapids Chicks, but lost to the Kalamazoo Lassies in the first round series. Crites went 0-for-3 in a playoff game.

Crites is part of Women in Baseball, a permanent display based at the Baseball Hall of Fame and Museum in Cooperstown, New York, which was unveiled in 1988 to honor the entire All-American Girls Professional Baseball League.

She died in 1990 in Phoenix, Arizona, at the age of 56.

Career statistics
Batting 

Fielding

Sources

All-American Girls Professional Baseball League players
Fort Wayne Daisies players
Baseball players from Missouri
Sportspeople from Cape Girardeau, Missouri
1934 births
1990 deaths
20th-century American women